The Dragonsitter is a 2012 children novella by Josh Lacey. It is about a young boy, Edward, and the problems he and his family experience while looking after a pet dragon for a week.

Publication history
2012, England, Andersen Press  
2013, Der Drachensitter, Anu Stohner (translator), Germany, Sauerländer  
2015, USA, Little, Brown and Company

Reception
Booktrust wrote, in a review of The Dragonsitter, "From catastrophe to worse, this is the madcap and giggle-inducing story of how to tackle a pet with a difference, with energetic drawings to match", and The Daily Telegraph described it as "short, sharp and funny."

The Dragonsitter has also been reviewed by Kirkus Reviews, Horn Book Guide Reviews, School Library Journal, School Library Connection, Publishers Weekly, and School Librarian.

It was shortlisted for the 2012 Roald Dahl Funny Prize: The Funniest Book for Children Aged Seven to Fourteen."

References

External links
Library holdings of The Dragonsitter

2012 children's books
British children's books
Fictional dragons
Books about dragons